Neocrepidodera cyanipennis is a species of flea beetle from Chrysomelidae family that can be found in Austria, France, Italy, Romania, Slovenia, and Switzerland.

References

Beetles described in 1860
Beetles of Europe
cyanipennis